The Architecture of Happiness is a book by Alain de Botton which discusses the importance of beauty, published by Pantheon Books in 2006. De Botton, inspired by Stendhal's motto "beauty is the promise of happiness," analyzes human surroundings and how human needs and desires manifest their ideals in architecture.

Reception
The book attracted favourable attention from architects and architectural critics. In the Boston Globe, the architectural critic Robert Campbell declared it the "best introduction to architecture" that he had ever read. There was favorable comment  from UK, US and Australian critics. The book featured prominently in the film 500 Days of Summer, where it was the reading matter of choice for the protagonist. In recognition of his services to architecture with the book, the RIBA made Alain de Botton an honorary fellow of the Institute in February 2010.

Not all reviews have been positive. Reviewing the book, New York Times reviewer Jim Holt, wrote "like de Botton’s previous books, ... contains its quota of piffle dressed up in pompous language," saying that de Botton's over-sensitivity to his surroundings even becomes humorous "in a Woody Allen-ish sort of way." Another reviewer, Mark Lamster in I.D. Magazine wrote, "[De Botton] has produced a meandering, pompous disquisition that betrays an autodidact’s haphazard sense of the field, but with little of the original thinking that might be expected from an outsider. ... The Architecture of Happiness would be an innocuous castoff if not for its proselytizing ambitions (it has so far spawned a PBS miniseries) and a set of rather insidious ideas camouflaged in its twee prose."

Cinematization
A television series, The Perfect Home, commissioned for Channel 4 and which first aired in 2006, was based on the book.

This book was featured in 500 Days of Summer.

References

2006 non-fiction books
Architecture books
Pantheon Books books
Books by Alain de Botton